The Learjet Model 35 and Model 36 are a series of American multi-role business jets and military transport aircraft manufactured by Learjet. When used by the United States Air Force they carry the designation C-21A.

The aircraft are powered by two Garrett TFE731-2 turbofan engines. Its cabin can be arranged for six to eight passengers. The longer-range Model 36 has a shortened passenger area to provide more space in the aft fuselage for fuel tanks.

The engines are mounted in nacelles on the sides of the aft fuselage. The wings are equipped with single-slotted flaps. The wingtip fuel tanks distinguish the design from other aircraft having similar functions.

Development

The concept which became the LJ35 began as the Learjet 25BGF (with GF referring to "Garrett Fan"), a Learjet 25 with a then-new TFE731 turbofan engine mounted on the left side in place of the 25's General Electric CJ610 turbojet engine. This testbed aircraft first flew in May, 1971. As a result of the increased power and reduced noise of the new engine, Learjet further improved the design, and instead of being simply a variant of the 25, it became its own model, the 35.

By 2018, 1980s Learjet 35As start at $500,000.

Operational history

In 1976 American professional golfer Arnold Palmer used a Learjet 36 to establish a new round-the-world class record of 22,894 miles (36990 km) completed in 57 hours 25 minutes 42 seconds.

Learjet 35s made the bulk of Escuadrón Fénix flights during the 1982 Falklands War mainly on diversion flights.

Production on the 35/36 series ceased in 1994.

, the U.S. National Transportation Safety Board database lists 25 fatal accidents for the 35/35A, and two for the 36/36A.

Variants

Learjet 35
The original Model 35 was powered by two TFE731-2-2A engines and was 13 inches longer than its predecessor, the Model 25. First flight of the prototype Model 35 was on 22 August 1973, and the aircraft was FAA certified in July, 1974. It could carry up to eight passengers. There were 64 base-model 35s built.

Learjet 35A
The Model 35A is an upgraded Model 35 with TFE731-2-2B engines and a range of 2,789 miles, with a fuel capacity of  931 US gallons (3,524 L) with refueling accomplished at ground level through each wingtip tank. It was introduced in 1976, replacing the 35. Over 600 35As were built, with a production line that ended with serial number 677, in 1993.

On February 12, 1996, a Learjet 35A, N10BD, owned by Cable Television Founder Bill Daniels and piloted by Mark E. Calkins, Charles Conrad, Jr., Paul Thayer, and D. Miller completed an around-the-world flight in a record 49 hrs, 21 min, and 8 sec. The record remains standing . This aircraft is now on display in Terminal C of Denver International Airport.
Learjet 36
The Model 36 is essentially identical to the 35, except that it has a larger fuselage fuel tank, giving it 500 miles longer range, but reducing the passenger area's length by 18 inches (0.46 m). It was certified, along with the 35, in July, 1974.

Learjet 36A
Like the 35A, the Model 36A has upgraded engines and a higher maximum gross weight. It was introduced in 1976, replacing the 36.

Military variants 
C-21A
The C-21A is a United States military designation for an "off the shelf" variant of the Learjet 35A for the United States Air Force, with room for eight passengers and 42 ft3 (1.26 m3) of cargo. In addition to its normal role, the aircraft is capable of transporting litters during medical evacuations. Delivery of the C-21A fleet began in April 1984 and was completed in October 1985.

There are 38 Air Force active duty aircraft, and 18 Air National Guard aircraft in the C-21A fleet. On 1 April 1997, all continental U.S.-based C-21As were realigned under Air Mobility Command, with the 375th Airlift Wing at Scott Air Force Base, Illinois, as the lead command. C-21As stationed outside the continental United States are assigned to the theater commanders.

U-36A
A Japanese military designation not a U.S. military designation. Utility transport, training version of the Learjet 35A. Equipped with a missile seeker simulator in addition to a radar, avionics, firing training assessment devices, an ejector pylon, a special communications system, a target towing system and a jammer system. Six were built for the Japan Maritime Self-Defense Force.

Notable accidents and incidents
 On 7 June 1982, during the Falklands War, a Learjet 35 of Argentina's Escuadrón Fénix was shot down by HMS Exeter. The aircraft had been participating in a reconnaissance mission when it was hit by a Sea Dart surface-to-air missile launched by the destroyer. All five crew were killed.
 On 13 February 1983, a Learjet 35A carrying Sri Lankan business tycoon Upali Wijewardene disappeared over the Straits of Malacca (Malaysia). The wreckage has never been found, nor any trace of Wijewardene, his top executives, or crew.
 On 17 September 1994, a Learjet 35A owned by Golden Eagle Aviation was accidentally shot down by the Republic of China Navy while being used as a target tug. All 4 crew on board were killed.
 On 17 April 1995, a C-21 crashed into a wooded area near Alexander City, Alabama killing the two pilots and six passengers, including Clark G. Fiester, assistant secretary of the Air Force for acquisition, and Major General Glenn A Profitt II.
 The 1996 New Hampshire Learjet 35A crash on Christmas Eve, 24 December, lead to the longest missing aircraft search in that state's history, lasting almost three years, and eventually resulted in Congressional legislation mandating improved emergency locator transmitters (ELTs) be installed in U.S.-registered business jets.
 On 29 August 1999, a U.S. registered Learjet 35A owned by Corporate Jets, Inc., was shot down near Adwa, Ethiopia, while flying from Luxor, Egypt, to Nairobi, Kenya, with the loss of three persons.
 On 25 October 1999, professional golfer Payne Stewart was killed in the crash of a Learjet 35. The plane apparently suffered a loss of cabin pressure at some point early in the flight. All on board are thought to have died of hypoxia, lack of oxygen. The plane, apparently still on autopilot, continued flying until one engine flamed out, most likely due to fuel starvation. It crashed near Aberdeen, South Dakota after an uncontrolled descent.  The exact cause of the pressurization failure and the reason behind the crew's failure or inability to respond to it has not been definitively determined.
 On 9 March 2006 Argentine Air Force Learjet 35A serial T-21 struck terrain and broke up shortly after takeoff from El Alto International Airport in La Paz, Bolivia killing all 6 on board. The Learjet was sent to Bolivia to deliver humanitarian aid.
 On 4 November 2007, a Learjet 35A crashed in São Paulo, Brazil, after a failed takeoff attempt. It destroyed a house in a residential area near the Campo de Marte Airport, killing the pilot, co-pilot and 6 family members who were in the house.
 On 24 June 2014, a Learjet 35A of the Gesellschaft für Flugzieldarstellung (GFD) was involved in a mid-air collision with a Eurofighter Typhoon of the German Air Force and crashed at Olsberg, Germany.
 On 9 November 2014, a private Learjet 36 crashed in Freeport, Grand Bahamas, Bahamas. The jet struck a shipping crane at the Grand Bahama Ship Yard, exploding on impact and crashing into the ground near a junkyard area. The plane was en route from the Lynden Pindling International Airport with nine people on board heading to Grand Bahama International Airport. All nine persons perished, including Myles Munroe, a Bahamian pastor.
  On 15 May 2017, Learjet 35A aircraft N452DA was on a repositioning flight from Philadelphia to Teterboro Airport in New Jersey, near New York City. The two pilots were killed after the aircraft stalled and crashed into a warehouse while circling to land. The NTSB investigation cited pilot error in continuing an unstable approach.
 On 27 December 2021, Learjet 35 aircraft N880Z was en route to Gillespie Field (KSEE) in El Cajon, California, near San Diego when it crashed onto a nearby street, killing all four occupants.
 On July 1, 2022, a medical flight Learjet 35A, registration LV-BPA suffered an accident at the Río Grande Gob. Ramón Trejo Noel airport, in the Province of Tierra del Fuego, Antarctica and South Atlantic Islands, Argentina, killing all four occupants.

Operators

Civilian operators
The Learjet 35 is operated by private, corporate and air taxi operators.

Military operators

 Argentine Air Force - operates a single Learjet 35 .

 Bolivian Air Force

 Brazilian Air Force - six in service .

 Chilean Air Force - two in service .

 Finnish Air Force - three in service .

 Japan Maritime Self Defense Force - four Learjet 36 in service .

 Mexican Air Force

 Namibian Air Force

 Peruvian Air Force - one Learjet 36 in service .

 Royal Saudi Air Force

 Swiss Air Force

 United Arab Emirates Navy

 United States Air Force - 19 C-21A in service .
 United States Navy - Two Learjet 35/36s .

 Royal Thai Air Force

Specifications (Learjet 36A)

See also

References

External links
 

35
1970s United States business aircraft
Aircraft first flown in 1973
Low-wing aircraft
T-tail aircraft
Twinjets